Golabek is a surname. In Polish gołąbek is diminutive of gołąb; pigeon, dove.  Notable people with the surname include:

Mona Golabek (born 1954), American concert pianist, author, and radio host
Stuart Golabek (born 1974), Scottish footballer

Polish-language surnames